Daud Turki (also known by his kunya  Abu Aida the father of Aida (the father/master of return)) (1927 – March 8, 2009), was a Palestinian-Israeli poet, living in Haifa, Israel. He was the leader of the united Jewish-Arab left-wing group called the Red Front, which was an anti-Zionist group. He was convicted on grounds of treason and spent 17 years in the Israeli jail in what is considered by the Israeli Security Agency as one of its famous historical affairs.

Daud Turki was born in 1927 to a Palestinian Christian family from the Galilee village of al-Maghar between Nazareth and Lake Tiberias. He grew up in the city of Haifa. His father's name is Simaan Daud, who died from being shot by British occupation troops in Haifa in the 1936-1939 uprising, and his mother Sadi'a Khouri is also from al-Maghar in the Galilee. His grandfather Turki belonged to the Daud clan of al-Mughar a traditional Christian Palestinian family group. In 1948 when Israel was established his immediate family fled from Haifa to the Druze village of Beit Jann, which afforded them protection and helped prevent them from becoming refugees. He was married to Khazna Daud and had three daughters Aida, Georget, and Nidal.

He was an Arab nationalist and a Marxist. He was a founding member of the Palestine Communist Party branch in Haifa during the time of British Mandate Palestine and fought British occupation of his homeland. After the establishment of Israel he joined the Israeli Communist Party Maki. He along with his extended family were expelled from the Israeli Communist Party in 1963 for his pro-China views and because of his insistence on the right of return of Palestinian refugees. His family returned to the Communist Party of Israel after its pro-Zionist members left it and it became known as Rakah, which is the main party in the Israeli political coalition called Hadash.

He was arrested in December 1972 and sentenced to 17 years in prison in March 1973 on charges of treason. He was released on May 20, 1985 as part of the "Galilee" prisoner exchange deal between Israel and the Popular Front for the Liberation of Palestine - General Command. After his release, he published a collection of poems he wrote while behind bars called "the Wind of Struggle" as well as his memoirs "Rebel from the Arab East". Daud Turki died at the age of 82 on March 8, 2009, supposedly from lung cancer.

See also 
Ehud Adiv
Palestinian Christians

Sources 

1927 births
2009 deaths
Israeli Arab Christians
Palestinian Arab nationalists
Palestinian Christians
Palestinian Marxists
Palestinian poets
People from Haifa
20th-century poets